"If Wishes Came True" is a song recorded by American freestyle/dance trio Sweet Sensation on their 1990 second studio album, Love Child. It was released as the album's second single on June 14, 1990 by Atco Records and Atlantic Records. It was written by Deena Charles, Robert Steele and Russ DeSalvo, and produced by Steve Peck. The song was a different musical direction for the girl group, known primarily for their freestyle hits. It was the biggest hit of their career, reaching  number one on the US Billboard Hot 100 on September 1, 1990. The song also became Sweet Sensation's only entry on the Billboard Adult Contemporary chart, where it reached number eight, and it peaked within the top 30 in Canada and New Zealand.

According to The Billboard Book of Number One Hits, the members of the group "cried for days" after learning that their song had hit number one. Billboard named the song number 87 on their list of "100 Greatest Girl Group Songs of All Time".

Composition

The album version of the song begins with strings and a flamenco guitar, then quickly picks up into a synthesizer line, an electric guitar solo, and the vocal begins soon afterward. The edited version omits the strings-and-guitar intro.

Music video
The video was filmed in New York City, and alternates studio shots of the trio singing with outdoor shots of lead singer Betty LeBron walking in the rain and reminiscing, with flashbacks to sunny scenes of better days with her former boyfriend.

Track listing

Charts

Weekly charts

Year-end charts

References

1990 singles
Sweet Sensation songs
Billboard Hot 100 number-one singles
Cashbox number-one singles
Pop ballads
Rock ballads
1990 songs
Atco Records singles
Atlantic Records singles
1990s ballads
Songs written by Russ DeSalvo